The 1881 CCNY Lavender football team represented the City College of New York during the 1881 college football season.

Schedule

References

CCNY
CCNY Beavers football seasons
CCNY Lavender football